Dębowola  is a village in the administrative district of Gmina Magnuszew, within Kozienice County, Masovian Voivodeship, in east-central Poland.

The village has a population of 170.

References

Villages in Kozienice County